Jake Mikael Larsson (born 9 January 1999) is a Swedish footballer who plays as a midfielder for Örebro SK.

Beginning his career in Adolfsbergs IK at the age of 7, he moved to Karlslunds IF at the age of 12 and joined the first team at the age of 17. He managed 41 league games and 7 league goals there. Following one year with Hammarby IF's U19 and U21, he signed for the first team of Örebro SK in 2019.

Showing stellar form at Örebro SK, he made his debut for Sweden U21 and was seen as a transfer prospect. In September 2020, however, he suffered the death of his brother, and subsequently "collapsed" as a player. He spent the winter of 2021 in rehabilitation physically and mentally.

References

1999 births
Living people
Swedish footballers
Association football midfielders
Karlslunds IF players
Örebro SK players
Allsvenskan players
Superettan players
Sweden under-21 international footballers